San Luis is an unincorporated community and census-designated place in Sandoval County, New Mexico, United States. Its population was 59 as of the 2010 census. New Mexico State Road 279 passes through the community.

Geography

Demographics

Education
The community's district is Cuba Independent Schools.

References

Census-designated places in New Mexico
Census-designated places in Sandoval County, New Mexico